Beka Mikeltadze (born 26 November 1997) is a Georgian professional footballer who plays as a forward for A-League Men club Newcastle Jets and the Georgia national team.

Club career
In 2018, after some successful seasons with Dinamo Tbilisi and Rustavi, Mikeltadze confirmed that some Russian clubs, including Orenburg and Lokomotiv Moscow were interested in signing him, however he moved to Cyprus and signed for Anorthosis Famagusta.

On 8 July 2019, he signed with Russian Premier League club FC Rubin Kazan. He made his debut for Rubin on 21 July 2019 as a half-time substitute in an away game against FC Dynamo Moscow and scored the winning goal in the 93rd minute to make the score 1–0.

On 11 February 2020, he joined Rotor Volgograd on loan until the end of the 2019–20 season. On 21 June 2020, he re-signed with Rotor on a permanent basis.

On 19 February 2021, he moved to Greek club Xanthi.

Newcastle Jets 
On 6 July 2021, Mikeltadze signed a two-year-deal with A-League Men club Newcastle Jets. Mikeltadze made his debut against Central Coast Mariners at the Newcastle International Sports Centre in a 2-1 defeat, where he played the entire match. In the following fixture against Western Sydney Wanderers, Mikeltadze scored his first goal for the club with a penalty kick in the 19th minute, slotting the ball past Tomás Mejías.

International career
He made his debut for Georgia national football team on 15 November 2020 in a Nations League game against Armenia. He substituted Valerian Gvilia in the 80th minute.

Honours
Individual
A-Leagues All Star: 2022

References

External links
 
 UEFA Player Profile
 Erovnuli Liga Player Profile

1997 births
Sportspeople from Kutaisi
Living people
Footballers from Georgia (country)
Georgia (country) youth international footballers
Georgia (country) under-21 international footballers
Georgia (country) international footballers
Expatriate footballers from Georgia (country)
Association football midfielders
Erovnuli Liga players
Cypriot First Division players
Russian Premier League players
Super League Greece 2 players
A-League Men players
FC Dinamo Tbilisi players
Anorthosis Famagusta F.C. players
FC Rubin Kazan players
FC Rotor Volgograd players
Xanthi F.C. players
Newcastle Jets FC players
Expatriate footballers in Cyprus
Expatriate footballers in Russia
Expatriate footballers in Greece
Expatriate soccer players in Australia